Donald Lester Richmond (October 27, 1919 – May 24, 1981) was a professional baseball third baseman.

Minor leagues
Richmond began his playing career in 1940, but it was interrupted for four years due to World War II. He won the International League batting crown in 1950 and 1951 while playing for the Rochester Red Wings, posting an amazing .350 average in 1951.

Richmond served as player-manager for the Batavia Indians in 1959.
 
Richmond was elected to the Rochester Red Wings Hall of Fame in 1990, and to the International League Hall of Fame in 2013.

Major leagues
Richmond played in the major leagues over parts of four seasons (1941, 1946–47, 1951) with the Philadelphia Athletics and St. Louis Cardinals. For his career, he compiled a .211 batting average in 152 at-bats, with two home runs and 22 runs batted in.

Personal life
Richmond was born in Gillett, Pennsylvania and died in Elmira, New York at the age of 61.

References

External links

1919 births
1981 deaths
Philadelphia Athletics players
St. Louis Cardinals players
Major League Baseball third basemen
Baseball players from Pennsylvania
Elmira Pioneers players
Anniston Rams players
Greenwood Dodgers players
Mobile Shippers players
Temple University alumni
Williamsport Grays players
Toronto Maple Leafs (International League) players
Birmingham Barons players
Toledo Mud Hens players
Baltimore Orioles (IL) players
Rochester Red Wings players
Syracuse Chiefs players
Miami Marlins (IL) players
Batavia Indians players